North China Electric Power University (NCEPU) is a national key university under the Double First Class University Plan and former Project 211 based in Beijing, China under the national Ministry of Education that specialises in polytechnic disciplines. The main campus is located in Beijing, and it has a branch campus in Baoding, Hebei Province. There are about 3,000 full-time faculty and staff, 20,000 undergraduates and 7,000 graduate students in this university. It is a Chinese state Double First Class University, identified by the Ministry of Education.

Introduction 
North China Electric Power University is affiliated with the Ministry of Education of China, and it is officially listed as one of the Double First Class University Plan, former Project 211  universities as well as a "Predominant Discipline Innovation Platform". At present, NCEPU is a key university jointly constructed by the Ministry of Education and the University Council, which is composed of State Grid Corporation of China, China Southern Power Grid Co., Ltd., China Huaneng Group, China Datang Corporation, China Huadian Corporation, China Guodian Corporation and China Power Investment Corporation.

History 
The university was established as the Beijing Institute of Electric Power in 1958. It was later renamed the North China Institute of Electric Power when its location was moved to Baoding, Hebei province in 1970.  When the school merged with the Beijing Power Engineering and Electronics Institute in 1995, it was given its present name. In 2006, the university relocated its main campus back to Beijing. It still operates a branch campus in Baoding.

A close neighbour of Badaling highway, adjoining Olympic Green on the east and Zhongguancun high technology zone and Shangdi Information Industry base on the west, North China Electric Power University is now located in Zhuxinzhuang, Beijing. It is found in beautiful surroundings.

As one of the key universities in China with a history of more than 40 years, this university has been fostering talents in the areas of engineering technology, management, economics and the social sciences. There are more than 8500 students with over 600 graduate students and doctor students.

Administration

Departments 
It has the following departments:
Department of Mathematical and Physics Science
Department of Electric Power Engineering
Department of Thermal Power Engineering
Department of Information Engineering
Department of Automation
Department of Computer Science and Technology
Department of Economics and Trade
Department of Finance and Accounting
Department of Law and Politics 
Department of Foreign Languages

Schools 
It has the following Schools:
Electrical and Electronic Engineering School
Energy and Power Engineering School
Renewable Energy School
Nuclear Science and Engineering School
Economics and Management School
School of Control and Computer Engineering
Environment Engineering and Science School
Human and Social Science School
Mathematical and Physical Science School
Foreign Language School
Science and Technology School

There is one centre for post-doctoral studies . The university offers one post-doctoral project program, 7 doctoral programs, 17 master's degree programs and 24 bachelor's degree programs. It has been authorised to admit overseas students.

There are five key ministerial subjects, namely power system and its automation, power plant thermal power engineering, theoretical electric engineering, industrial automation and technological economics. Meanwhile, there are three key ministerial laboratories called Power System Intelligence Protection and Control, Industrial Process Simulation and Control, State Monitoring and Fault Diagnosis in Electric Device.

Interscholastic relations 
The university has set up cooperative relations with universities and institutes in more than 20 countries and regions such as Britain, United States, France, Russia, Japan and Taiwan. It offers exchange opportunities to students to study at universities in other countries, such as Illinois Tech, Purdue, UC Berkeley, the University of Bath and  University of Strathclyde, etc.

This university is also the starting member of Cooperation Consortium of Beijing High Technology Universities, which is a major academic interschool association in northern China.

References

External links
North China Electric Power University Official website

 
Universities and colleges in Beijing
Universities and colleges in Hebei
Educational institutions established in 1958
1958 establishments in China
Plan 111